Ivanec is a town in northern Croatia, located southwest of Varaždin and east of Lepoglava, north of the mountain Ivanščica.

History
In the late 19th and early 20th century, Ivanec was a district capital in Varaždin County of the Kingdom of Croatia-Slavonia.

Population

In the 2011 census, the population of the municipality is 13,765, in the following settlements:

 Bedenec, population 732
 Cerje Tužno, population 182
 Gačice, population 355
 Gečkovec, population 116
 Horvatsko, population 173
 Ivanec, population 5,234
 Ivanečka Željeznica, population 253
 Ivanečki Vrhovec, population 307
 Ivanečko Naselje, population 237
 Jerovec, population 827
 Kaniža, population 287
 Knapić, population 62
 Lančić, population 299
 Lovrečan, population 490
 Lukavec, population 141
 Margečan, population 384
 Osečka, population 220
 Pece, population 81
 Prigorec, population 531
 Punikve, population 445
 Radovan, population 372
 Ribić Breg, population 145
 Salinovec, population 512
 Seljanec, population 223
 Stažnjevec, population 340
 Škriljevec, population 247
 Vitešinec, population 96
 Vuglovec, population 333
 Željeznica, population 134

References

External links
  
ivanec.biz

Cities and towns in Croatia
Populated places in Varaždin County
Varaždin County (former)